Asen Donchev (Bulgarian: Асен Дончев; born 22 October 2001) is a Bulgarian footballer who plays as a defender for CSKA Sofia.

Career
Donchev joined CSKA Sofia from the Litex academy in 2016. He made his senior debut on 21 April 2021, in a 6–1 league win over Montana at Bulgarian Army Stadium, replacing Graham Carey for the final 15 minutes. On 25 July 2022, Donchev scored his first goal for the team, netting the winner in the 1:0 league victory over Cherno More.

Career statistics

Club
As of 11 September 2022

Honours
CSKA Sofia
 Bulgarian Cup: 2020–21

References

External links
 

2001 births
Living people
Bulgarian footballers
Association football midfielders
PFC CSKA Sofia players
First Professional Football League (Bulgaria) players
Sportspeople from Blagoevgrad